The Loire 70 was a 1930s French long-range maritime reconnaissance flying boat produced by Loire Aviation.

Design and development

The Loire 70 was designed to meet a 1932 French Navy requirement for a long-range flying boat for maritime reconnaissance and bombing. The prototype first flew on 28 December 1933. It was an all-metal monoplane, with a heavily braced high wing, with three radial engines mounted above the wing, two as tractors and one as a pusher. The original engines, three 500 hp (373 kW) Gnome et Rhône 9Kbr radials, were not powerful enough and were replaced with 740 hp (552 kW) Gnome-Rhône 9Kfr radials. Seven production aircraft were produced.

Operational history
The seven production aircraft and the prototype were all delivered to the French Navy, serving with Escadrille E7 at Karouba in Tunisia. During the early days of World War II, the aircraft carried out patrols in the Mediterranean. In an Italian air raid on their base on 12 June 1940, three of the four surviving aircraft were destroyed. The remaining Loire 70 was one of a number of aircraft that were requested to be scrapped on 4 October 1941.

Operator

French Navy

Specifications

See also

References

Bibliography
 
 

070
Loire 070
Flying boats
Three-engined push-pull aircraft
High-wing aircraft
Aircraft first flown in 1933